Carlini is an Italian surname. Notable people with this name include the following:

 Agostino Carlini (1718?–1790), Italian sculptor and painter
 Antonio Carlini (2001), Canadian soccer player
 Armando Carlini (1878–1959), Italian philosopher and author
 Benedetta Carlini (1591–1661), Catholic mystic and lesbian nun
 Francesco Carlini (1783–1862), Italian astronomer
 Giacomo Carlini (1904–1963), Italian sprinter, hurdler and a specialist in combined events
 John Carlini, American Grammy nominated jazz guitarist and arranger
 Giulian Carlini,(born 1995) Italian-Canadian, world famous artist
 Massimiliano Carlini (born 1986), Italian footballer
 Michel Carlini (1889–1955), French politician
 Paolo Carlini (1922–1979), Italian stage, television and film actor
 Uga Carlini, South African film director, writer and producer

See also

Cârligi (disambiguation)
Carlin (name)
Carlina (name)
Carline
Carling (given name)
Carlino (name)
Carloni

Notes

Italian-language surnames
Patronymic surnames
Surnames from given names